Zhang Yaotiao was a 9th-century Chinese poet of the Tang dynasty.

Her place and date of birth are not known. Zhang is referred to as Maiden Zhang Yaotiao in some sources. She was forced to flee to Chengdu in what is now Sichuan province, where she became a courtesan. At one point in her life, destitute, she was forced to pawn her clothes to support herself. Several of her poems are included in the Quan Tangshi. Tang Xianzu quotes lines from her poetry in his play Mǔdān tíng (The Peony Pavilion).

References 

Date of birth unknown
Date of death missing
9th-century Chinese poets
Tang dynasty poets
Chinese women poets
9th-century Chinese women writers